In Greek mythology, Lycon (Ancient Greek: Λύκων or Λυκῶνα Lykon; gen.: Λύκωνος means 'wolf') or Lyco (λύκοι); may refer to the following personages:

 Lycon, the "bold" satyr leader who joined the army of Dionysus in his campaign against India.
Lycon, an Achaean warrior who participated in the Trojan War. He was slain by the Trojan prince Deiphobus, son of King Priam. The latter slew Lycon with a lance which pierced him close above the groin making his bowels gushed out.
 Lyco, a Trojan soldier who fought during the siege of Troy. He was killed by Peneleus, a Boeotian leader. The latter and Lyco rushed together with their spears but had missed the other and they rushed again together with their swords. Then, Lyco let drive upon the horn of the helm with horse-hair crest, and the sword was shattered at the hilt. The Boeotian smote him upon the neck beneath the ear, and all the blade sank in, so that nothing but the skin held fast, and the head hung to one side, and his limbs were loosed.
 Lycon, another Trojan warrior who defended the city of Ilium. He died at the hands of the Cretan leader, Meriones.

Notes

References 

 Homer, The Iliad with an English Translation by A.T. Murray, Ph.D. in two volumes. Cambridge, MA., Harvard University Press; London, William Heinemann, Ltd. 1924. . Online version at the Perseus Digital Library.
 Homer, Homeri Opera in five volumes. Oxford, Oxford University Press. 1920. . Greek text available at the Perseus Digital Library.
 Nonnus of Panopolis, Dionysiaca translated by William Henry Denham Rouse (1863-1950), from the Loeb Classical Library, Cambridge, MA, Harvard University Press, 1940.  Online version at the Topos Text Project.
 Nonnus of Panopolis, Dionysiaca. 3 Vols. W.H.D. Rouse. Cambridge, MA., Harvard University Press; London, William Heinemann, Ltd. 1940-1942. Greek text available at the Perseus Digital Library.
 Quintus Smyrnaeus, The Fall of Troy translated by Way. A. S. Loeb Classical Library Volume 19. London: William Heinemann, 1913. Online version at theio.com
 Quintus Smyrnaeus, The Fall of Troy. Arthur S. Way. London: William Heinemann; New York: G.P. Putnam's Sons. 1913. Greek text available at the Perseus Digital Library.

Achaeans (Homer)